The 1960 New Zealand general election was a nationwide vote to determine the shape of the New Zealand Parliament's 33rd term. It saw the governing Labour Party defeated by the National Party, putting an end to the short second Labour government.

Background
The Labour Party had won the 1957 election by a narrow margin, beginning New Zealand's second period of Labour government. However, the new administration soon lost its narrow lead in public opinion, with its financial policies being the principal cause of dissatisfaction. The so-called "Black Budget", introduced by finance minister Arnold Nordmeyer, increased taxes substantially, with particularly large increases for alcohol and tobacco taxes; Labour became widely seen as both miserly and puritanical. The government defended its tax increases as a necessary measure to avert a balance of payments crisis, but the opposition, led by Keith Holyoake, made substantial gains out of the issue throughout the parliamentary term.

Both parties crafted narratives on the history of the balance of payments crisis in the lead up to the election. Holyoake tried to argue that overseas funds had not fallen as much as Nash said in 1957, and that Labour had produced a panic budget. Moreover, the over-importing was due to a fear of import controls if Labour should win. Nash continued to stress that National had produced the worst economic crisis since the Great Depression and that Labour had averted further disaster by its action. Coincidentally, at the beginning of the election another drop in overseas funds occurred, but neither party commented much about it.

Labour's main policy platform was on industrialization particularly with new cotton mills in Nelson. Nash constantly repeated the theme people in New Zealand had 'never been so well off' and pamphlets stated 'everyone, everywhere, will again be better off', closely mirroring British Prime Minister Harold Macmillan's winning slogan in 1959, 'You've never had it so good'. National's campaign promised to lower taxes, reduce import controls and abolish compulsory unionism.

A very thorough study of the election by three political scientists concluded that National's preparations for the election, organization, and publicity were much better than Labour's which was the main reason for the result with little substantial differences between the parties in policy. National's party organisation recognised their win was mostly due to public mood against Labour and many traditional Labour voters not bothering to vote. As a result Labour's vote share had fallen more than National's had risen.

MPs retiring in 1960
Five National MPs and four Labour MPs intended to retire at the end of the 32nd Parliament.

The election
The date for the main 1960 election was 26 November. 1,310,742 people were registered to vote, and turnout was 89.8%. This turnout was slightly lower than what had been recorded in the previous elections. The number of seats being contested was 80, a number which had been fixed since 1902.

Results
The 1960 election saw the governing Labour Party defeated by a twelve-seat margin, having previously held a two-seat majority. National won a total of 46 seats to Labour's 34 seats, and formed the second National government.  In the popular vote, National won 47.59% to Labour's 43.42%.

The Social Credit Party won 8.62% of the vote, but no seats. Three of their candidates missed the nomination deadline, and the opening address of the party leader P. H. Matthews was not noteworthy.

Three new National members of parliament were called the Young Turks: Peter Gordon, Duncan MacIntyre and Robert Muldoon. The other new National MPs were Esme Tombleson, Bill Brown, Harry Lapwood, Logan Sloane, Bert Walker, and Dan Riddiford.

Paddy Blanchfield, Ron Bailey, Norman Douglas and George Spooner entered parliament for Labour.

Votes summary

The table below shows the results of the 1960 general election:

Key

|-
 |colspan=8 style="background-color:#FFDEAD" | General electorates
|-

|-
 | Hauraki
 | style="background-color:;" |
 | colspan=3 style="text-align:center;background-color:;" | Arthur Kinsella
 | style="text-align:right;" | 2,635
 | style="background-color:;" |
 | style="text-align:center;" | Albert Clifford Tucker
|-

|-
 |colspan=8 style="background-color:#FFDEAD" | Māori electorates
|-

|}
Table footnotes:

Bibliography 
 The New Zealand Gazette "Members of the House of Representatives Elected – General Election" (20 December 1960) issue 84 page 2002.

Notes

References

 
November 1960 events in New Zealand